Mississippi Lad is an album by saxophonist Teddy Edwards featuring Tom Waits on two tracks which was recorded in 1991 and originally released on the French Verve/Gitanes label in Europe and on Antilles Records in the US. The album was Edwards' first recording in a decade.

Track listing 
All compositions by Teddy Edwards
 "Little Man" – 4:39
 "Safari Walk" – 7:43
 "The Blue Sombrero" – 6:13
 "Mississippi Lad" – 6:44
 "Three Base Hit" – 7:13
 "I'm Not Your Fool Anymore" – 5:02
 "Symphony on Central" – 6:36
 "Ballad for a Bronze Beauty" – 5:12
 "The Call of Love" – 8:22

Personnel 
Teddy Edwards – tenor saxophone, arranger
Tom Waits – vocals, guitar (tracks 1 & 6)
Nolan Smith – trumpet
Jimmy Cleveland – trombone
Art Hillery – piano
Leroy Vinnegar – bass
Billy Higgins – drums
Ray Armando – percussion

References 

1991 albums
Teddy Edwards albums
Verve Records albums
Antilles Records albums